Windmills are known worldwide as an iconic symbol of Dutch culture. Some 1,200 historic windmills survive, most of which are gristmills or polder mills. Many remain fully functional, and their upkeep and operation is promoted by a number of civic organizations, including De Hollandsche Molen, Gilde van Vrijwillige Molenaars and Stichting De Fryske Mole. Several Dutch villages are known for their concentration of windmills, including Kinderdijk, Zaanse Schans, and Schiedam, home to the tallest windmill in the world. Tjaskers, a kind of windmill native to Friesland, were also used for water management.

This list of windmills in the Netherlands is grouped by province. Flevoland, the Netherlands' newest province, is not included. Types of Dutch windmills include:

Lists of Dutch windmills by province

 List of windmills in Drenthe
 List of windmills in Friesland
 List of windmills in Gelderland
 List of windmills in Groningen
 List of windmills in Limburg
 List of windmills in North Brabant
 List of windmills in North Holland
 List of windmills in Overijssel
 List of windmills in South Holland
 List of windmills in Utrecht
 List of windmills in Zeeland

 
 
Netherlands